The Jerra Jerra Creek, a perennial stream of the Murray River catchment within the Murray-Darling basin, is located in the Riverina region of New South Wales, Australia.

Course and features
The creek descends  over its  course.

See also 

 List of rivers of New South Wales (A-K)
 Rivers of New South Wales

References

External links
 
 Map of the Billabong Creek NSW Murray Wetlands Working Group

Rivers of New South Wales
Murray-Darling basin
Rivers in the Riverina
Greater Hume Shire